Queen's Eyot is an island in the River Thames in England on the reach above  Boveney Lock, just upstream of Oakley Court near Windsor, Berkshire.

The island is owned by Eton College and contains a club house that is available for hire for functions.

See also
Islands in the River Thames

External links
Queens Eyot

Islands of Berkshire
Islands of the River Thames
Bray, Berkshire